A fluvial cirque is a steephead valley formed in a Karst landscape.

In Europe

In France 
 Cirque du Bout du Monde (Côte d'Or) in Burgundy
 Cirque du Bout du Monde (Herault) in Languedoc

Bout du Monde